Elm Creek is an unincorporated community recognized as a local urban district in Manitoba, Canada. It is about 50 km west of Winnipeg and about 35 km southeast of Portage la Prairie. It is located in the Rural Municipality of Grey. It is home to the second largest fire hydrant in the world which was unveiled on Canada Day, 2001. It is also the home of the second largest H4 chondrite (a class of stony meteorite) ever found in Canada.  The 8.2-kg mass was found by a local grader driver on a rural road in 1997.  Elm Creek has a Kindergarten to Grade 12 school.

Climate
According to the Köppen Climate Classification system, Elm Creek has a humid continental climate, abbreviated "Dfb" on climate maps.

Demographics 

References

Designated places in Manitoba
Local urban districts in Manitoba
Unincorporated communities in Pembina Valley Region